The 1997 Tulane Green Wave football team was an American football team that represented Tulane University during the 1997 NCAA Division I-A football season as a member of Conference USA. In their first year under head coach Tommy Bowden, the team compiled an overall record of 7–4, with a mark of 5–1 in conference play, placing second in C-USA.

Schedule

References

Tulane
Tulane Green Wave football seasons
Tulane Green Wave football